Station Content is a 1918 American silent drama film directed by Arthur Hoyt and starring Gloria Swanson. The original, five reel feature is presumed to be lost, but a one reel abridgment created in 1926 does survive and has been released on video.

Plot
As described in a film magazine, when Jim Manning (Hill) is rebuked by his wife Kitty (Swanson) for failure to secure a promotion that will take them away from Cybar, an isolated spot, he replies in kind, and the strained relations lead to Kitty running away with a musical comedy company. She meets Stephen Morton, president of the railroad, who becomes fascinated with her. He wishes to free himself from his wife and marry her, and Kitty promises an answer within a month. While returning to the city, she is held overnight at a small railroad station and memories fill her with remorse. She learns that lightning has destroyed a bridge on the train line, and after a wild ride on a gasoline handcar is able to save the limited. Morton and her husband Jim are both on the train, and a reconciliation between the couple is effected.

Cast
 Gloria Swanson as Kitty Manning
 Lee Hill as Jim Manning
 Arthur Millett as Stephen Morton
 Nellie Allen as Mrs. Morton
 Ward Caulfield as Theatrical manager
 May Walters as Mrs. Rothfield
 Fay McKenzie as Kitty's Baby (uncredited)

Reception
Like many American films of the time, Station Content was subject to cuts by city and state film censorship boards. For example, the Chicago Board of Censors required a cut, in Reel 4, of the intertitle "My proposition is square. I want real companionship."

The film was released in New Zealand beginning in October 1918, using both its original title and the alternative title The Runaway Wife.

References

External links

1918 films
1918 drama films
Silent American drama films
American silent feature films
American black-and-white films
Films directed by Arthur Hoyt
Triangle Film Corporation films
Lost American films
1918 lost films
Lost drama films
1910s American films
1910s English-language films